Ahmed Bashir (born 10 December 1995) is a Pakistani cricketer. He made his first-class debut for Lahore Eagles in the 2014–15 Quaid-e-Azam Trophy on 12 November 2014. In September 2019, he was named in Central Punjab's squad for the 2019–20 Quaid-e-Azam Trophy tournament. In January 2021, he was named in Central Punjab's squad for the 2020–21 Pakistan Cup.

References

External links
 

1995 births
Living people
Pakistani cricketers
People from Vehari
Lahore Eagles cricketers
Khan Research Laboratories cricketers
Central Punjab cricketers